WBRQ may refer to:

 WBRQ (FM), a radio station (91.9 FM) licensed to serve La Grange, Georgia, United States
 WNVM, a radio station (97.7 FM) licensed to serve Cidra, Puerto Rico, which held the call sign WBRQ from 1972 to 2009